The Langley Academy is an academy in Langley, east of Slough in Berkshire, south east England. It opened in September 2008, replacing the former Langleywood Secondary School. The building was designed by Foster and Partners, led by the architect Norman Foster and by Buro Happold. The school is supported by the Arbib Foundation. It has a specialism of science and a museum education theme, including exhibits in the school building. It also promotes sport, notably cricket and rowing.

History
Langley Wood Secondary School was created in 1982 on the site of the former Langley Secondary Modern School following a merger with the former Homewood Secondary Modern School. As of 2005 Langley wood had about 800 pupils. From 2003 to 2005, Langley wood was in Ofsted 'special measures', but this period was successfully completed in November 2005. Upon the closure of Langley wood Ofsted were invited into the school by the outgoing headmaster, Paul McAteer, to give a final report. This final report described Langley Wood as "a good school with outstanding features."

In July 2004, Slough Borough Council, the local education authority, agreed to support the establishment of an academy on the Langley Wood site. Langley Wood closed in July 2008 and was replaced by The Langley Academy in September 2008. The new academy opened in new buildings designed by Foster and Partners and was sponsored by the Arbib Foundation.

The Langley Academy under the leadership of its first principal, Chris Bowler, quickly established itself as the most popular non-selective secondary school in Slough as judged by parental preferences. It set high standards of behavior and discipline and set about the process of raising attainment and expectations as well as giving students a real voice in the way that the academy was run. It became known in the area and beyond for its focus on science (it is a science specialist academy) and for being the only museum learning school in the UK. It also had a focus on rowing, helped by Olympic double gold medalist Andy Holmes.

The progress made in the first two years was noted by OFSTED in the Section 8 report from July 2010, where the academy was classed as having made 'good progress', in contrast to many other academies that opened at the same time. Its exam results rose significantly during the first three years, outperforming the school it had replaced.

The principal, Chris Bowler, left the academy before the full OFSTED inspection in July 2011. He was replaced by Peter Blewitt as acting principal until a permanent appointment was made in the autumn term when Rhodri Bryant was appointed as the new principal.

Houses
All students in the Langley Academy are assigned to one of six houses each with its own focus:

 Arbib – Sustainability
 Nash – Humanitarianism
 Simmons – Internationalism
 Herschel – Enquiry
 Holmes – Sportsmanship
 Kumar – Creativity

References

External links

Academies in Slough
Educational institutions established in 2008
International Baccalaureate schools in England
Museum education
Foster and Partners buildings
School museums
Secondary schools in Slough
2008 establishments in England